The following units and commanders of the U.S. and Mexican armed forces fought in the siege of Veracruz from March 9 to 29, 1847, during the Mexican–American War.

United States

U.S. Army
MG Winfield Scott

General Staff "Little Cabinet"
 Chief Engineer: Col Joseph Totten
 Chief of Artillery: Col James Bankhead, 2nd U.S. Artillery
 Inspector General: Ltc Ethan Allen Hitchcock
 Staff Coordinator: Cpt Henry Lee Scott
 Engineer Aide-de-Camp: Maj John L. Smith
 Engineer Aide-de-Camp: Cpt Joseph E. Johnston
 Engineer Aide-de-Camp: Cpt Robert E. Lee
 Engineer Aide-de-Camp: 1st Lt Pierre G. T. Beauregard
 Engineer Aide-de-Camp: 2nd Lt Zealous B. Tower

U.S. Navy
Home Squadron
Commodore David Conner
Commodore Matthew C. Perry

Mexico
BG Juan Estaban Morales
2nd-in-command: BG Jose Juan Landero
Chief of Engineers: Ltc Manuel Robles Pezuela

Notes

References

 Alcaraz, Ramon. Apuntes para la historia de la Guerra entre Mexico y los Estados Unidos. Mexico City. Published by Manuel Payno. 1848.
 Ramsey, Albert C. The Other Side or Notes for the History of the War Between Mexico & the United States. New York, John Wiley. 1850.
 Roa Barcena, Jose Maria. Recuerdos de la invasion norte-americana. Ed. Antonio Castro Leal. Mexico City, Editorial Porrua. 1947.
Mexican–American War orders of battle